Thomas Knox (circa 1640 – 11 May 1728) was an Irish politician.

He sat in the Irish House of Commons for Newtownards from 1692 to 1693 and then for Dungannon from 1695 to 1727. On 18 November 1715 he was appointed to the Irish Privy Council.

His daughter Mary married Oliver St George in 1701.

References

1640s births
1728 deaths
Irish MPs 1692–1693
Irish MPs 1695–1699
Irish MPs 1703–1713
Irish MPs 1713–1714
Irish MPs 1715–1727
Members of the Privy Council of Ireland
Members of the Parliament of Ireland (pre-1801) for County Down constituencies
Members of the Parliament of Ireland (pre-1801) for County Tyrone constituencies